J. G. Léopold Langlois (October 2, 1913 – February 13, 1996) was a Canadian lawyer and parliamentarian.

Born in Ste-Anne-des-Monts, Quebec, he was a lawyer specializing in maritime law. During World War II, he served in the Royal Canadian Navy as a lieutenant commander.

In 1940, he was defeated when he ran as an Independent Liberal in the riding of Gaspé, Quebec. After the war, he was elected in 1945 as a Liberal. He was re-elected in 1949 and 1953. He was defeated in 1957. From 1951 to 1953, he was the Parliamentary Assistant to the Postmaster General. From 1953 to 1957, he was the Parliamentary Assistant to the Minister of Transport.

In 1966, he was appointed to the Senate representing the senatorial division of Grandville, Quebec.  From 1974 to 1979, he was the Deputy Leader of the Government in the Senate. In 1979, he was the Deputy Leader of the Opposition in the Senate. He retired on his 75th birthday in 1988.

External links
 

1913 births
1996 deaths
Members of the House of Commons of Canada from Quebec
Liberal Party of Canada MPs
Liberal Party of Canada senators
Canadian senators from Quebec